Weissella ceti  is a Gram-positive and non-spore-forming bacterium from the genus of Weissella which was first isolated from beaked whales.  Erstwhile believed that W. ceti  could cause hemorrhagic illness in Rainbow trouts, however, seems to be a different species from the same genus: Weissella tructae.

References

External links
Type strain of Weissella ceti at BacDive -  the Bacterial Diversity Metadatabase

 

Bacteria described in 2011
Fish diseases
Weissella